Shahidabad (also Romanized as Shahīdābād) is a village in Bajgan Rural District, Aseminun District, Manujan County, Kerman Province, Iran. At the 2006 census, its population was 62, in 21 families.

References 

Populated places in Manujan County